The mountain blind skink (Dibamus montanus) is a legless lizard endemic to Vietnam.

References

Dibamus
Reptiles of Vietnam
Reptiles described in 1921
Taxa named by Malcolm Arthur Smith